This is a list of free and open-source software packages, computer software licensed under free software licenses and open-source licenses. Software that fits the Free Software Definition may be more appropriately called free software; the GNU project in particular objects to their works being referred to as open-source. For more information about the philosophical background for open-source software, see free software movement and Open Source Initiative. However, nearly all software meeting the Free Software Definition also meets the Open Source Definition and vice versa. A small fraction of the software that meets either definition is listed here.
Some of the open-source applications are also the basis of commercial products, shown in the List of commercial open-source applications and services.

Artificial intelligence

General AI 
OpenCog – A project that aims to build an artificial general intelligence (AGI) framework. OpenCog Prime is a specific set of interacting components designed to give rise to human-equivalent artificial general intelligence.

Computer vision 
AForge.NET – computer vision, artificial intelligence and robotics library for the .NET Framework
OpenCV – computer vision library in C++

Machine learning 
 See List of open-source machine learning software
 See Data Mining below
 See R programming language – packages of statistical learning and analysis tools

Planning 
TREX – Reactive planning

Robotics 
Robot Operating System (ROS)
Webots – Robot Simulator
YARP – Yet Another Robot Platform

Assistive technology

Speech (synthesis and recognition)
CMU Sphinx – Speech recognition software from Carnegie Mellon University
Emacspeak – Audio desktop
ESpeak – Compact software speech synthesizer for English and other languages
Festival Speech Synthesis System – General multilingual speech synthesis
Modular Audio Recognition Framework – Voice, audio, speech NLP processing
NonVisual Desktop Access – (NVDA) Screen reader, for Windows
Text2Speech – Lightweight, easy-to-use Text-To-Speech (TTS) Software

Other assistive technology
Dasher – Unique text input software
Gnopernicus – AT suite for GNOME 2
Virtual Magnifying Glass – A multi-platform screen magnification tool

CAD

 FreeCAD – Parametric 3D CAD modeler with a focus on mechanical engineering, BIM, and product design
 LibreCAD – 2D CAD software using AutoCAD-like interface and file format
 SolveSpace - 2D and 3D CAD, constraint-based parametric modeler with simple mechanical simulation abilities.
 BRL-CAD -  a constructive solid geometry (CSG) solid modeling computer-aided design (CAD) system.
 Open Cascade Technology (OCCT) - a software development platform for 3D CAD, CAM, CAE, etc

Finite Element Analysis (FEA) 
 Gmsh - A three-dimensional finite element mesh generator with built-in pre- and post-processing facilities.

Electronic design automation (EDA) 

 Fritzing - a CAD software for the design of electronics hardware to build more permanent circuits from prototypes
 KiCad - a suite for electronic design automation (EDA) for schematic capture, PCB layout, manufacturing file viewing, SPICE simulation, and engineering calculation

Computer simulation

 Blender – 3D computer graphics software toolset used for creating animated films, visual effects, art, 3D printed models, and motion graphics.
 OpenFOAM - open-source software used for computational fluid dynamics (or CFD).
 FlightGear - atmospheric and orbital flight simulator with a flight dynamics engine (JSBSim) that is used in a 2015 NASA benchmark to judge new simulation code to space industry standards.
 SimPy – Queue-theoretic event-based simulator written in Python
 Salome - a generic platform for Pre- and Post-Processing for numerical simulation

Cybersecurity

Antivirus

ClamAV
ClamWin
Lynis

Data loss prevention

MyDLP

Data recovery

dvdisaster
Foremost
PhotoRec
TestDisk

Forensics

The Coroner's Toolkit
The Sleuth Kit

Anti-forensics

USBKill
TAILS
BusKill

Disk erasing

DBAN
srm

Encryption

AES
Bouncy Castle
GnuPG
GnuTLS
KGPG
NaCl
OpenSSL
Seahorse
Signal
stunnel
TextSecure
wolfCrypt

Disk encryption

dm-crypt
CrossCrypt
FreeOTFE and FreeOTFE Explorer
eCryptfs

Firewall

Uncomplicated Firewall (ufw)
Firestarter
IPFilter
ipfw
iptables
M0n0wall
PeerGuardian
PF
pfSense
Rope
Shorewall
SmoothWall
Vyatta

Network and security monitoring

Snort – Network intrusion detection system (IDS) and intrusion prevention system (IPS)
OpenVAS – software framework of several services and tools offering vulnerability scanning and vulnerability management

Secure Shell (SSH)

Cyberduck – macOS and Windows client (since version 4.0)
Lsh – Server and client, with support for SRP and Kerberos authentication
OpenSSH – Client and server
PuTTY – Client-only

Password management
Bitwarden
KeePass
KeePassXC (multiplatform fork able to open KeePass databases)
Password Safe
Mitro
 Pass

Other cybersecurity programs

Data storage and management

Backup software

Database management systems (including administration)

 Apache Cassandra - A NoSQL database from Apache Software Foundation offers support for clusters spanning multiple datacenter
 Apache CouchDB - A NoSQL database from Apache Software Foundation with multi-master replication
 PostGIS - Adds support for geographic objects to the PostgreSQL as per Open Geospatial Consortium (OGC)
 PostgreSQL - A relational database management system emphasizes on extensibility and SQL compliance and available for  Windows, Linux, FreeBSD, and OpenBSD

Data mining 
Environment for DeveLoping KDD-Applications Supported by Index-Structures (ELKI) – Data mining software framework written in Java with a focus on clustering and outlier detection methods
FrontlineSMS – Information distribution and collecting via text messaging (SMS)
Konstanz Information Miner (KNIME)
OpenNN – Open-source neural networks software library written in C++
Orange (software) – Data visualization and data mining for novice and experts, through visual programming or Python scripting. Extensions for bioinformatics and text mining
RapidMiner – Data mining software written in Java, fully integrating Weka, featuring 350+ operators for preprocessing, machine learning, visualization, etc. – the prior version is available as open-source
Scriptella ETL – ETL (Extract-Transform-Load) and script execution tool. Supports integration with J2EE and Spring. Provides connectors to CSV, LDAP, XML, JDBC/ODBC, and other data sources
Weka – Data mining software written in Java featuring machine learning operators for classification, regression, and clustering
JasperSoft – Data mining with programmable abstraction layer

Data Visualization Components
ParaView – Plotting and visualization functions developed by Sandia National Laboratory; capable of massively parallel flow visualization utilizing multiple computer processors
VTK – Toolkit for 3D computer graphics, image processing, and visualisation.

Digital Asset Management software system

Disk partitioning software

Enterprise search engines
ApexKB, formerly known as Jumper
Lucene
Nutch
Solr
Xapian

ETLs (Extract Transform Load)
Konstanz Information Miner (KNIME)
Pentaho

File archivers

File systems
OpenAFS – Distributed file system supporting a very wide variety of operating systems
Tahoe-LAFS – Distributed file system/Cloud storage system with integrated privacy and security features
CephFS – Distributed file system included in the Ceph storage platform.

Desktop publishing 
Collabora Online Draw and Writer - Enterprise-ready edition of LibreOffice accessible from a web browser. The Draw application is for flyers, newsletters, brochures and more, Writer has most of the functionality too.
Scribus – Designed for layout, typesetting, and preparation of files for professional-quality image-setting equipment. It can also create animated and interactive PDF presentations and forms.
LyX – A "What You See Is What You Mean" document creation system, LyX makes use of the LaTeX markup macro system for TeX, allowing the elegant creation of documents which match up with the layouts in it for various document classes.

E-book management and editing 
 Calibre – Cross-platform suite of ebook software
Collabora Online Writer - Enterprise-ready edition of LibreOffice accessible from a web browser. Allows exporting in the EPUB format.
Sigil – Editing software for e-books in the EPUB format

Education

Educational suites
ATutor – Web-based Learning Content Management System (LCMS)
Chamilo – Web-based e-learning and content management system
Claroline – Collaborative Learning Management System
DoceboLMS – SAAS/cloud platform for learning
eFront – Icon-based learning management system
FlightPath – Academic advising software for universities
GCompris – Educational entertainment, aimed at children aged 2–10
Gnaural – Brainwave entrainment software
H5P – Framework for creating and sharing interactive HTML5 content
IUP Portfolio – Educational platform for Swedish schools
ILIAS – Web-based learning management system (LMS)
Moodle – Free and open-source learning management system
OLAT – Web-based Learning Content Management System
Omeka – Content management system for online digital collections
openSIS – Web-based Student Information and School Management system
Sakai Project – Web-based learning management system
SWAD – Web-based learning management system
Tux Paint – Painting application for 3–12 year olds
UberStudent – Linux based operating system and software suite for academic studies

Learning support

Language
Kiten

Typing
KTouch – Touch typing lessons with a variety of keyboard layouts
Tux Typing – Typing tutor for children, featuring two games to improve typing speed

File managers

Finance

Accounting 

 GnuCash – Double-entry book-keeping
 HomeBank – Personal accounting software
 KMyMoney – Double-entry book-keeping
 LedgerSMB – Double-entry book-keeping
 RCA open-source application – management accounting application
 SQL Ledger – Double-entry book-keeping
 TurboCASH – Double-entry book-keeping for Windows
 Wave Accounting – Double-entry book-keeping

Cryptocurrency 

 Bitcoin – Blockchain platform, peer-to-peer decentralised digital currency
 Ethereum – Blockchain platform with smart contract functionality

CRM 

 CiviCRM – Constituent Relationship Management software aimed at NGOs
 iDempiere – Business Suite, ERP and CRM
 SuiteCRM – Web-based CRM

ERP 

 Adempiere – Enterprise resource planning (ERP) business suite
 Apache OFBiz - A suite of enterprise applications from  Apache Software Foundation
 Compiere – ERP solution automates accounting, supply chain, inventory, and sales orders
 Dolibarr – Web-based ERP system
 ERPNext – Web-based open-source ERP system for managing accounting and finance
 ERP5 - Single Unified Business Model based system written with Python and Zope 
 iDempiere - Fully navigable on PCs, tablets and smartphones driven only by a community of supporters
 Ino erp – Dynamic pull based system ERP
 JFire – An ERP business suite written with Java and JDO
 LedgerSMB - A double entry accounting and ERP system written with Perl
 metasfresh – ERP Software
 Odoo – Open-source ERP, CRM and CMS
 Openbravo – Web-based ERP
 Tryton – Open-source ERP

Human resources 
 OrangeHRM – Commercial human resource management

Microfinance 
 Cyclos – Software for microfinance institutions, complementary currency systems and timebanks
 Mifos – Microfinance Institution management software

Process management 
 Bonita Open Solution – Business Process Management

Trading 
 QuickFIX – FIX protocol engine written in C++ with additional C#, Ruby, and Python wrappers
 QuickFIX/J – FIX protocol engine written in Java

Games

Action 
Xonotic – First-person shooter that runs on a heavily modified version of the Quake engine known as the DarkPlaces engine
Warsow – First-person shooter fast-paced arena FPS game that runs on the Qfusion engine

Application layer
WINE – Allows Windows applications to be run on Unix-like operating systems

Emulation 

MAME – Multi-platform emulator designed to recreate the hardware of arcade game systems 
MESS – Multi-platform emulator designed to recreate the hardware of video game consoles 
RetroArch – Cross-platform front-end for emulators, game engines and video games
Snes9x – A Super Nintendo emulator 
Stella – Atari 2600 emulator 
PCSX – A PlayStation emulator designed to recreate the hardware of the original PlayStation system
PCSX2 - A PlayStation 2 emulator designed to recreate the hardware of PlayStation 2 system
PPSSPP - A PlayStation Portable emulator designed to recreate the hardware of PlayStation Portable system
Project64 – A Nintendo 64 emulator 
RPCS3 - A PlayStation 3 emulator designed to recreate the hardware of PlayStation 3 system
Dolphin (emulator) - A GameCube and Wii emulator designed to recreate the hardware of GameCube and Wii systems
Citra (emulator) - A Nintendo 3DS and Wii emulator designed to recreate the hardware of Nintendo 3DS systems
Cemu - A Wii U emulator designed to recreate the hardware of Wii U systems
Yuzu (emulator) - a Nintendo Switch emulator

Puzzle 
Pingus – Lemmings alternative with penguins instead of lemmings.

Sandbox 
Minetest – An open source voxel game engine.

Simulation 
OpenTTD – Business simulation game in which players try to earn money via transporting passengers and freight by road, rail, water and air.
SuperTuxKart – Kart racing game that features mascots of various open-source projects.

Strategy 
0 A.D. – Real-time strategy video game
Freeciv – Turn-based strategy game inspired by the proprietary Sid Meier's Civilization series.
The Battle for Wesnoth – Turn-based strategy video game with a fantasy setting

Genealogy

 Gramps (software) – a free and open source genealogy software.

Geographic information systems 
 QGIS – cross-platform desktop geographic information system (GIS) application that supports viewing, editing, and analysis of geospatial data.

Graphical user interface

Desktop environments

Window managers

Windowing system

Groupware

Content management systems

Wiki software

Healthcare software

Integrated library management software
 Evergreen – Integrated Library System initially developed for the Georgia Public Library Service's PINES catalog
 Koha – SQL-based library management
 NewGenLib
 OpenBiblio
 PMB
 refbase – Web-based institutional repository and reference management software

Image editor
 Darktable – Digital image workflow management, including RAW photo processing
 digiKam – Integrated photography toolkit including editing abilities
 GIMP – Raster graphics editor aimed at image retouching/editing
 Inkscape – Vector graphics editor
 Karbon – Scalable vector drawing application in KDE
 Krita – Digital painting, sketching and 2D animation application, with a variety of brush engines
 LazPaint – Lightweight raster and vector graphics editor, aimed at being simpler to use than GIMP
 LightZone – Free, open-source digital photo editor software application.
 RawTherapee – Digital image workflow management aimed at RAW photo processing

Mathematics

Statistics 
 R – Statistics software

Numerical analysis 
 Octave - Numerical analysis software
 Scilab - Numerical analysis software

Geometry 
 Geogebra – Geometry and algebra

Spreadsheet 
 LibreOffice Calc – spreadsheet component of the LibreOffice package 
 Gnumeric - spreadsheet program of the  GNOME Project 
 Calligra Sheets – spreadsheet component of the Calligra Suite in KDE
 Pyspread – spreadsheet which uses Python for macro programming, and allows each cell to contain data, the results of a calculation, a Python program, or the results of a Python program.

Media

Audio editors, audio management

 Audacity
 LMMS

CD/USB-writing software

Flash animation
Pencil2D – For animations
SWFTools – For scripting

Game engines

Blender Game Engine – Discontinued in 2019.
Godot – Application for the design of cross-platform video games.
Leela Chess Zero – Universal Chess Interface chess engine
MonoGame – C# Framework 
Open3DEngine – Based on Amazon Lumberyard. 
Stockfish – Universal Chess Interface chess engine
Stride – (prev. Xenko) 2D and 3D cross-platform game engine originally developed by Silicon Studio.

Graphics

2D 
Pencil2D – Simple 2D graphics and animation program
Synfig – 2D vector graphics and timeline based animation
TupiTube (formerly KTooN) – Application for the design and creation of animation
OpenToonz – Part of a family of 2D animation software
Krita – Digital painting, sketching and 2D animation application, with a variety of brush engines
Blender – Computer graphics software, Blender's Grease Pencil tools allow for 2D animation within a full 3D pipeline.
mtPaint – raster graphics editor for creating icons, pixel art

3D
Blender – Computer graphics software featuring modeling, sculpting, texturing, rigging, simulation, rendering, camera tracking, video editing, and compositing
OpenFX – Modeling and animation software with a variety of built-in post processing effects
Seamless3d – Node-driven 3D modeling software
Wings 3D – subdivision modeler inspired by Nendo and Mirai from Izware.

Image galleries

Image viewers
Eye of GNOME
F-spot
feh
Geeqie
Gthumb
Gwenview
KPhotoAlbum
Opticks

Multimedia codecs, containers, splitters

Television

Video converters

Dr. DivX
FFmpeg
MEncoder
OggConvert

Video editing

Avidemux
AviSynth
Blender
Cinelerra
DVD Flick
Flowblade
Kdenlive
Kino
LiVES
LosslessCut
Natron
Olive
OpenShot
Pitivi
Shotcut
VirtualDub
VirtualDubMod
VideoLAN Movie Creator

Video encoders

Avidemux
HandBrake
FFmpeg

Video players

Media Player Classic
VLC media player
 mpv

Other media packages
Celtx – Media pre-production software
Open Broadcaster Software (OBS) – Cross-platform streaming and recording program

Networking and Internet

Advertising
Revive Adserver

Communication-related
Asterisk – Telephony and VoIP server
Ekiga – Video conferencing application for GNOME and Microsoft Windows
ConferenceXP – video conferencing application for Windows XP or later
FreePBX – Front-end and advanced PBX configuration for Asterisk
FreeSWITCH – Telephony platform
Jami – Cross-platform, peer to peer instant-messaging and video-calling protocol that offers end-to-end encryption and SIP client
Jitsi – Java VoIP and Instant Messaging client
QuteCom – Voice, video, and IM client application
Enterprise Communications System sipXecs – SIP Communications Server
Slrn – Newsreader
Telegram
Twinkle – VoIP softphone
Tox – Cross-platform, peer-to-peer instant-messaging and video-calling protocol that offers end-to-end encryption

E-mail

Amavis – Email content filter
Claws Mail – Email Client 
Fetchmail – Email Retrieval 
Geary – Email client based on WebKitGTK+
GNUMail – Cross-platform email client
Hula – Discontinued mail and calendar project 
K-9 Mail – Android Email Client
MailScanner – Email security system
MH Message Handling System – Email Client 
Modest – Email Client 
Mozilla Mail & Newsgroups – Email Client that was part of the now discontinued Mozilla Application Suite
Mozilla Thunderbird – Email, news, RSS, and chat client
POPFile – Cross-platform mail filter 
Roundcube – Web-based IMAP email client 
Sylpheed – Email and News Client 
Sympa – MLA software
Vpopmail – Email management software

File transfer

Grid and distributed processing
GNU Queue
HTCondor
OpenLava
pexec

Instant messaging

IRC Clients

Middleware
Apache Axis2 – Web service framework (implementations are available in both Java & C)
Apache Geronimo – Application server
Bonita Open Solution – a J2EE web application and java BPMN2 compliant engine
GlassFish – Application server
Jakarta Tomcat – Servlet container and standalone webserver
JBoss – Application server
ObjectWeb JOnAS – Java Open Application Server, a J2EE application server
OpenRemote – IoT Middleware
TAO (software) – C++ implementation of the OMG's CORBA standard
Enduro/X – C/C++ middleware platform based on X/Open group's XATMI and XA standards

RSS/Atom readers/aggregators
Akregator – Platforms running KDE
Liferea – Platforms running GNOME
NetNewsWire – macOS, iOS
RSS Bandit – Windows, using .NET Framework
RSSOwl – Windows, Mac OS X, Solaris, Linux using Java SWT Eclipse
Sage (Mozilla Firefox extension)

Peer-to-peer file sharing

Popcorn Time – Multi-platform, free, and open-source media player
qBittorrent – Alternative to popular clients such as μTorrent
Transmission – BitTorrent client

Portal Server
Drupal
Liferay
Sun Java System Portal Server
uPortal

Remote access and management
FreeNX
OpenVPN
rdesktop
Synergy
VNC (RealVNC, TightVNC, UltraVNC)
Remmina (based on FreeRDP)

Routing software

Web browsers

Graphical 
Chromium – web browser using the custom Blink engine from which Google Chrome draws its source code
Brave – privacy-focused web browser based on Chromium browser
Falkon – web browser based on Blink engine, a KDE project
Firefox – Mozilla-developed web browser using Gecko layout engine
Waterfox – Firefox fork supporting legacy extensions, 64-bit only
Pale Moon - a customizable fork of Firefox
Tor Browser – onion-routed browser by The Tor Project, based on Firefox ESR  
GNOME Web - WebKit-based web browser for the GNOME desktop environment
Midori – Lightweight web browser using the WebKit layout engine
qutebrowser - keyboard operated Webkit-based browser with vi-like keybindings
SeaMonkey Navigator – the SeaMonkey internet suite's web browser
Surf - a minimal tab-less browser by suckless.org using WebKitGTK
Firefox Focus - privacy-focused mobile web browser from Mozilla available for Android and iOS

Text-based 
Lynx - a text-based web browser developed since 1992
Links - a text-based browser with a framebuffer-based graphical mode
Elinks - featureful fork of Links with javascript support

Webcam
Cheese – GNOME webcam application
Guvcview – Linux webcam application

Webgrabber
cURL
HTTrack
Wget

Web-related
Apache Cocoon – A web application framework
Apache – The most popular web server
AWStats – Log file parser and analyzer
BookmarkSync – Tool for browsers
Cherokee – Fast, feature-rich HTTP server
curl-loader – Powerful HTTP/HTTPS/FTP/FTPS loading and testing tool
FileZilla – FTP
Hiawatha – Secure, high performance, and easy-to-configure HTTP server
HTTP File Server – User-friendly file server software, with a drag-and-drop interface
lighttpd – Resource-sparing, but also fast and full-featured, HTTP Server
Lucee – CFML application server
Nginx – Lightweight, high performance web server/reverse proxy and e-mail (IMAP/POP3) proxy
NetKernel – Internet application server
Qcodo – PHP5 framework
Squid – Web proxy cache
Vaadin – Fast, Java-based framework for creating web applications
Varnish – High-performance web application accelerator/reverse proxy and load balancer/HTTP router
XAMPP – Package of web applications including Apache and MariaDB
Zope – Web application server

Web search engines
Searx – Self-hostable metasearch engine
YaCy – P2P-based search engine

Other networking programs
JXplorer – LDAP client
Nextcloud – A fork of ownCloud
OpenLDAP – LDAP server
ownCloud – File share and sync server
Wireshark – Network monitor

Office suites 
Apache OpenOffice - The cross platform office productivity suite from  Apache Software Foundation (ASF) consists of programs for word processing, spreadsheets, presentation, diagrams and drawings, databases, etc.
Calligra Suite – The office productivity suite from KDE consists of programs for word processing, spreadsheets, presentation, databases, vector graphics, and digital painting
Collabora Online - Enterprise-ready edition of LibreOffice, web application, mobile phone, tablet, Chromebook and desktop (Windows, macOS, Linux)
LibreOffice – The cross platform office productivity suite from The Document Foundation (TDF) consists of programs for word processing, spreadsheets, presentation, diagrams and drawings, databases, etc.
ONLYOFFICE Desktop Editors – An open-source offline edition of the Cloud

Operating systems
Be advised that available distributions of these systems can contain, or offer to build and install, added software that is neither free software nor open-source.

Emulation and Virtualisation

DOSBox – DOS programs emulator (including PC games)
VirtualBox – hosted hypervisor for x86 virtualization

Personal information managers
Chandler – Developed by the OSAF
KAddressBook
Kontact
KOrganizer
Mozilla Calendar – Mozilla-based, multi-platform calendar program
Novell Evolution
Perkeep – Personal data store for pictures
Project.net – Commercial Project Management
TeamLab – Platform for project management and collaboration

Programming language support

Bug trackers
Bugzilla
Mantis
Mindquarry
Redmine
Trac

Code generators
Bison
CodeSynthesis XSD – XML Data Binding compiler for C++
CodeSynthesis XSD/e – Validating XML parser/serializer and C++ XML Data Binding generator for mobile and embedded systems
Flex lexical analyser – Generates lexical analyzers
Open Scene Graph – 3D graphics application programming interface
OpenSCDP – Open Smart Card Development Platform
phpCodeGenie
SableCC – Parser generator for Java and .NET
SWIG – Simplified Wrapper and Interface Generator for several languages
^txt2regex$
xmlbeansxx – XML Data Binding code generator for C++
YAKINDU Statechart Tools – Statechart code generator for C++ and Java

Documentation generators
Doxygen – Tool for writing software reference documentation. The documentation is written within code
Mkd – Extracts software documentation from source code files, pseudocode, or comments
Natural Docs – Claims to use a more natural language as input from the comments, hence its name

Configuration software
Autoconf
Automake
BuildAMation
CMake

Debuggers (for testing and trouble-shooting)
GNU Debugger – A portable debugger that runs on many Unix-like systems
Memtest86 – Stress-tests RAM on x86 machines
Xnee – Record and replay tests

Integrated development environments

Version control systems

Reference management software

Risk Management 
Active Agenda – Operational risk management and Rapid application development platform

Science

Bioinformatics

Cheminformatics 
 Chemistry Development Kit
 JOELib
 OpenBabel

Electronic Lab Notebooks 
 Jupyter

Geographic Information Systems

Geoscience

Grid computing 
 P-GRADE Portal – Grid portal software enabling the creation, execution and monitoring of workflows through high-level Web interfaces

Microscope image processing 
 CellProfiler – Automatic microscopic analysis, aimed at individuals lacking training in computer vision
 Endrov – Java-based plugin architecture designed to analyse complex spatio-temporal image data
 Fiji – ImageJ-based image processing
 Ilastik – Image-classification and segmentation software
 ImageJ – Image processing application developed at the National Institutes of Health
 IMOD – 2D and 3D analysis of electron microscopy data
 ITK – Development framework used for creation of image segmentation and registration programs
 KNIME – Data analytics, reporting, and integration platform
 VTK – C++ toolkit for 3D computer graphics, image processing, and visualisation
 3DSlicer – Medical image analysis and visualisation

Molecular dynamics 
 GROMACS – Protein, lipid, and nucleic acid simulation
 LAMMPS – Molecular dynamics software
 MDynaMix – General-purpose molecular dynamics, simulating mixtures of molecules
ms2 - molecular dynamics and Monte Carlo simulation package for the prediction of thermophysical properties of fluids
 NWChem – Quantum chemical and molecular dynamics software

Molecule viewer 
 Avogadro – Plugin-extensible molecule visualisation
 BALLView – Molecular modeling and visualisation
 Jmol – 3D representation of molecules in a variety of formats, for use as a teaching tool
 Molekel – Molecule viewing software
 MeshLab – Able to import PDB dataset and build up surfaces from them
 PyMOL – High-quality representations of small molecules as well as biological macromolecules
 QuteMol – Interactive molecule representations offering an array of innovative OpenGL visual effects
 RasMol – Visualisation of biological macromolecules

Nanotechnology 
 Ninithi – Visualise and analyse carbon allotropes, such as carbon nanotube, Fullerene, graphene nanoribbons

Plotting 

Veusz

Quantum chemistry

 CP2K – Atomistic and molecular simulation of solid-state, liquid, molecular, and biological systems

Screensavers 
BOINC
Electric Sheep
XScreenSaver

Statistics

 R – Statistics software
 LimeSurvey – Online survey system

Theology

Bible study tools
 Go Bible – A free Bible viewer application for Java mobile phones
 Marcion – Coptic–English/Czech dictionary
 OpenLP – A worship presentation program licensed under the GNU General Public License
 The SWORD Project – The CrossWire Bible Society's free software project

Typesetting

See also

 Open-source software
 Open-source license
 
 
 
 
 
 
 GNOME Core Applications
 List of GNU packages
 List of KDE applications
 List of formerly proprietary software
 List of Unix commands

General directories
 AlternativeTo
 CodePlex
 Free Software Directory
 Freecode
 Open Hub
 SourceForge

References

External links
 Open Source Software Directory (OSSD), a collection of FOSS organized by target audience.
 List of open-source programs (LOOP) for Windows, maintained by the Ubuntu Documentation Project.
 The OSSwin Project, a list of free and open-source software for Windows

Free software lists and comparisons
Lists of software